Tetronarce puelcha, commonly known as the Argentine torpedo, is a species of fish in the family Torpedinidae. It is found in Argentina, Brazil, and Uruguay. Its natural habitat is open seas. It is rare electric ray fish species, which is moderately large (104 cm) found in South West Atlantic (mostly in Argentina and Brazil).

References

Tetronarce
Fish described in 1926
Strongly electric fish
Taxonomy articles created by Polbot